Pfaff is a surname. Notable people with the surname include:

 Alfred Pfaff, German football player
 Anita Bose Pfaff, economist
 Chris Pfaff, American television actor
 Debby Pfaff, reality show personality
 Dieter Pfaff (1947–2013), German actor
 Eva Pfaff, German tennis player
 Ferenc Pfaff, Hungarian architect
 Georg Michael Pfaff, German manufacturer of sewing machines
 Jean-Marie Pfaff, Belgian football player
 Johann Friedrich Pfaff, German mathematician
 Concepts named after him include the Pfaffian, Pfaffian functions, and the Pfaff problem
 29491 Pfaff, a main-belt asteroid named in his honour
 John Pfaff, American legal scholar
 Judy Pfaff, artist
 Kristen Pfaff, American musician
 Lyndsey Pfaff, reality show personality
 Michael Pfaff, American musician
 Petra Pfaff, East German hurdler
 Richard William Pfaff, American historian of the liturgy
 William Pfaff, American author

Other uses
Pfaff, a sewing machine manufacturer
Pfaff v. Wells Electronics, Inc. US Supreme Court case involving inventor Wayne K. Pfaff
H. & J. Pfaff Brewing Company

See also 
 faff
 faffing

German-language surnames